Three Sisters Mountain is a mountain near Dahlonega, Lumpkin County, Georgia with a trio of peaks known locally as Rattlesnake, Wildcat and McBrayer.

Notes

External links 
 
 

Mountains of Georgia (U.S. state)
Mountains of Lumpkin County, Georgia